Burne (variations: Byrnes, Byrne, O'Byrne, O'Byrnes, Burns, Beirne, Bourne) is a surname. Notable people with the surname include:

Alfred Burne (1886–1959), soldier and military historian
Charlotte Sophia Burne (1850–1923), author and editor, president of the Folklore Society
Christopher F. Burne, brigadier general in the United States Air Force
Edward Burne-Jones (1833–1898), British artist and designer who worked closely with William Morris
Gary Burne (1943–1976), Rhodesian dancer, ballet master, and choreographer
Grayson Burne, British sprint canoeist who competed from the early 1980s to the mid-1990s
 Henry de Burne
James Burne Ferguson, 19th century Member of Parliament in New Zealand
Judith Burne (born 1962), rower
Loh Gwo Burne (born 1974), Malaysian politician
Nancy Burne (1907–1954), British film actress
Nicol Burne (1574–1598), Scottish Roman Catholic controversialist
Owen Tudor Burne (1837–1909), British major-general
Philip Burne-Jones (1861–1926), first child of the British Pre-Raphaelite artist Sir Edward Burne-Jones
Richard Burne (1882–1970)
Robert Burne, American microbiologist
Wilfred Burne (1903–1989), British diver

See also
Burne Hogarth (1911–1996), American cartoonist, illustrator, educator, author and theoretician
Burne-Jones baronets, title in the Baronetage of the United Kingdom